The Arbuthnot Bank crash led to the fall of Arbuthnot & Co, a premier British-owned financial institution in Madras Presidency, British India in October 1906. The incident is considered to be one of the key events which influenced the Indian independence movement in Tamil Nadu.

In the last quarter of 1906, Madras (now Chennai) was hit by the worst financial crisis the city was ever to suffer. Of the three best-known British commercial names in 19th-century Madras, one crashed; a second had to be resurrected by a distress sale; and the third had to be bailed out by a benevolent benefactor. Macfadyen, one of the partners, engaged in speculation, in the process losing huge amounts of the firm's money. Prior to its collapse, Arbuthnots employed between 11,000 and 12,000 people, had 7,000 creditors and £1,000,000 in liabilities. It was ascertained  that  the  liabilities  of  Macfadyen's were £400,000 and there were 1,000 creditors.  It was agreed by the English trustee in bankruptcy and the official assignee in Madras that the assets of the two insolvent firms were to be treated as one and the same business, all creditors were to be entitled to share rateably in the pooled assets.

Macfadyen committed suicide by throwing himself under a train in 1906, and both firms had to close their doors. Both Macfadyen and Arbuthnot were consistently over-optimistic concerning their speculations. Arbuthnot was tried for the fraudulent activities the collapse revealed, and received a sentence of "18 months rigorous imprisonment".

The depositors approached eminent lawyer V. Krishnaswami Iyer who fought Arbuthnot Bank on their behalf and obtained a compensation for them. Later, he was one of the founder-directors of Indian Bank which was founded upon the ruins of Arbuthnot Bank.

Notes 

Indian independence movement in Tamil Nadu
Economic history of Tamil Nadu
Banking in India
1906 in British India
Bank failures
1906 crimes in India